Jacques Bernard (born 7 May 1929) is a French actor. His mother, Josyane, was a motion picture actress active from the end of the 1920s until the beginning of sound film. He appeared in Les Enfants terribles (1950) by Jean-Pierre Melville and Dear Caroline (1950). He was born in Paris.

Theatre

Author 
 1961: Niki-Nikou by Jacques Bernard, directed by Christian-Gérard, Théâtre de la Potinière
 1977: Une femme presque fidèle by Jacques Bernard, directed by Claude Brosset, Élysée Montmartre

Comedian 
 Fin des années 1950: tournées classiques, festivals
 1958 : Faust by Paul Valéry, directed by Yves Gasc, Théâtre Gramont
 1961 : Horace by Pierre Corneille, directed by Jean-François Rémi, Alliance française
 1961 : Niki-Nikou by Jacques Bernard, directed by Christian-Gérard, Théâtre de la Potinière
 1973 : Seul le poisson rouge est au courant by Jean Barbier and Dominique Nohain, directed by Dominique Nohain, Théâtre Charles de Rochefort, Théâtre des Nouveautés, then Théâtre des Capucines
 1977 : Une femme presque fidèle by Jacques Bernard, directed by Claude Brosset, Élysée Montmartre

Filmography

Actor

Cinema 
 1950: Les Enfants terribles by Jean-Pierre Melville : Gérard
 1951: Darling Caroline by Richard Pottier : Henri de Bièvre
 1953: Horizons sans fin by Jean Dréville : Pigeon
 1953 : Des quintuplés au pensionnat by René Jayet : Francis
 1953 : Le Grand Pavois by Jack Pinoteau 
 1955: Chantage by Guy Lefranc
 1955: Marguerite de la nuit by Claude Autant-Lara
 1955: Tamango by John Berry 
 1957: Police judiciaire by Maurice de Canonge
 1960: Love and the Frenchwoman : narrator 
 1960: Normandie-Niémen by Jean Dréville : Perrier
 1961: Alerte au barrage by Jacques Daniel-Norman
 1962: Le Scorpion
 1963: Tante Aurore viendra ce soir : Léonard Berdiller
 1966: Le Chien fou by Eddy Matalon: the inspector
 1966: Les Combinards by Jean-Claude Roy : Claude
 1967: Comment les séduire by Jean-Claude Roy
 1967: Réseau secret by Jean Bastia
 1968: The Black Hand by Max Pécas
 1970: Les Amours particulières (or Malaise) by Gérard Trembasiewicz: Georges Garais
 1973: L'Insolent by Jean-Claude Roy: L’élégant
 1973 : Le Sang des autres
 1973 : Les Confidences érotiques d'un lit trop accueillant by Michel Lemoine
 1974: Les petites saintes y touchent by Michel Lemoine
 1976: Les Nuits chaudes de Justine by Jean-Claude Roy
 1977: La Grande Extase
 1981: Madame Claude 2 : Pelletier

Television 
 1961: Épreuves à l'appui, épisode 21 de la série TV Les Cinq Dernières Minutes directed by  
 196: Les Cinq Dernières Minutes, episode La Chasse aux grenouilles directed by Claude Loursais
 1968: Tarif de nuit (Les Cinq Dernières Minutes, episode 46, TV) by Guy Séligmann
 1972: Figaro-ci, Figaro-là (telefilm): La Blache
 1973: Joseph Balsamo, television serial by André Hunebelle: the dolphin
 1973: La Ligne d'ombre (television film): Gabriel
 1974: Cadoudal (television film) : Thriot
 1974: Le Fol Amour de Monsieur de Mirabeau (TV serial) : Saint-Mauris
 1976 :  : Une femme presque fidèle by Jacques Bernard, mise en scène Jacques Mauclair, directed by Pierre Sabbagh, Théâtre Édouard VII
 1977 : , episode : Maigret and Monsieur Charles by Jean-Paul Sassy
 1982 : La Tendresse by Bernard Queysanne

Dubbing 
 Jackie Chan in:
 New Fist of Fury: A Lung
 To Kill with Intrigue: Hsiao Lei
 Snake in the Eagle's Shadow: Chien Fu
 Drunken Master: Wong Fei-hung
 Spiritual Kung Fu: Yi-Lang
 The Fearless Hyena: Shing Lung
 Dragon Fist: Tang How-yuen
 Half a Loaf of Kung Fu: Jiang
 Fantasy Mission Force: Sammy
 Dragon Lord: Dragon
 Project A: Dragon Mi Yong
 My Lucky Stars: Muscle
 Game of Death II : Billy Lo (Kim Tai Chung)

Discography 
Songs written and interpreted by Jacques Bernard
 1982: Fidèle à ma façon, composed by Jacky Reggan
 1982: Les bas noirs, composed by Jacky Reggan
 Jacques Bernard is also the author of songs interpreted by Rika Zaraï, Anne Vanderlove and Jean-Claude Pascal

Publications 
 Le présent du passé : souvenirs d’un acteur, L'Harmattan, (2012, 200 p.

External links 
 
 Notice Jacques Bernard sur Les Gens du Cinéma
 Interview de Jacques Bernard sur La Gazette du doublage
 30 films liés à Jacques Bernard sur CinéRessources.net

Male actors from Paris
1929 births
Possibly living people
20th-century French male actors